Pulikundram is a village located  from Thirukazhukundram, an ancient town in Chengalpattu district of the South Indian state of Tamil Nadu. It is known for its Sri Lakshmi Narayana temple. The Lakshmi Narayan temple was built between 1509 and 1529 during the reign of Krishnadevaraya Wodeyar of the Vijayanagara Empire.

Geography
Pulikkundram location Coordinates: 13°20'47"N   79°49'29"E

See also
 List of Hindu temples in India

References
 AboutLocation
 Nearest locations from Pulikundram
 About Temple
 About Temple

Villages in Chengalpattu district